The Yucatán banded gecko (Coleonyx elegans) is a species of geckos found in Mexico, Guatemala, and Belize.

It is a common inhabitant of forested and open habitats throughout Yucatan peninsula. It is terrestrial and largely nocturnal. It feeds on invertebrates, including spiders, crickets and beetles.

References 

Coleonyx
Reptiles of Guatemala
Reptiles of Belize
Reptiles described in 1845
Taxa named by John Edward Gray